Erik Rickard Sarby (19 September 1912 – 10 February 1977) was a Swedish sailor. He competed in the mixed one-person dinghy event at the 1948, 1952 and 1956 Olympics and finished in fourth, third and fifth place, respectively.

Born in a village near Uppsala, Sarby moved to the main city in the 1930s. There he worked as a hairdresser and sailed in free time. He later became a boat designer.

Boat designer
Having taken up the design of sailing canoes (his success with C-class designs is noted in the Swedish Wikipedia), Rickard Sarby submitted an entry, named 'FIN', to a 1948 competition for the design of a single-handed dinghy suitable for both local and Olympic use. The design was based on an earlier open class E double-ended sailing canoe. The success of the subsequent prototype 'FINT' dinghy in sailing trials was sufficient to reverse its rejection in earlier rounds of selection. Further renamed Finn, it has remained an Olympic class ever since, thus being the longest-running class in the Olympic fleet.

References

1912 births
1977 deaths
Olympic bronze medalists for Sweden
Sailors at the 1948 Summer Olympics – Firefly
Sailors at the 1952 Summer Olympics – Finn
Sailors at the 1956 Summer Olympics – Finn
Olympic sailors of Sweden
Swedish male sailors (sport)
Olympic medalists in sailing
Swedish yacht designers
Uppsala Kanotförening sailors
Medalists at the 1952 Summer Olympics
People from Östhammar Municipality
Sportspeople from Uppsala County